Teatro Dante (also called Cinema Teatro Dante) is an Italian theatre in Sansepolcro, a town in Tuscany, Italy, in the province of Arezzo.
The theatre was inaugurated on September 1, 1836, and was originally known as the Royal Theatre Dante (Regio Teatro Dante). The premiere performance was Vincenzo Bellini's opera La sonnambula (The sleepwalker).
The building, remained the property of the Accademia dei Risorti ( literally "Academy of the Resurrected" ) until today.
The building began as a simple theater for the people, nowadays it is also a movie theater, not precluding a theater season with comedies, operettas and concerts in a good level.

History

The origin and the theatre of fortune 
The news reached the present day are fragmentary, but carefully preserved.
We know that the project was commissioned by Cosimo III de' Medici, Grand Duke of Tuscany in September 1674 to promote culture in the provinces of his grand duchy. So, he settled 1500 scudi d'oro for the construction of a large room then made it a theatre, to keep the youth well trained and better eloquent to serve the prince. The first name was Teatro della Fortuna (the fortune theatre), and was left under management to a local association, Accademia degli Sbalzati, led by the poet Pietro Gherardi. The first theatre was built entirely in wood. In 1727 the academy ceases to exist. From the ashes of the old one, a new association was born with the name of academy of the nobles who will reevaluate the structure and it will enhance the activities.

The nineteenth century and the Dante theatre 
The activity of the theatre would proceed regularly until 1832 when the last known association was born after the merge of the two local academies: The Nobles and The Resurrected, that formed the Academy of the Nobles Resurrected. To witness this union, an olive tree became the new blazon of the association, cut at the lower end with new branches growing back on the sides, symbolizing the definitive rebirth of the association. The academy was not to be the only one to be renewed. The old theater, now dilapidated and in poor condition, was demolished in favor of a new building, built in stone in front of the old theater. Work began in 1833, a year after the birth of the new academy, led by the florentine Francesco Leoni and continued until August 1836. On September 1, the new theater called royal Dante theatre was inaugurated with La Sonnambula by Vincenzo Bellini. The name of the theater was chosen to pay tribute to one of the most important poets of Italy, the florentine Dante Alighieri.

The restoration and the movie theater 
Over the years, the structure adapts to the times starting to show the first film shows in the 50s, after the Second World War. After those tragic years, the academy resumed full control of the theater, valuing it as a movie theater. For this step, very important for the history of the theater, we must not forget the role of Luigi Monti, the Regia Aeronautica pilot in World War II. "The Colonel" (as it was called by everyone) worked hard for the complete reorganization of the theater and the academy, adapting it to current standards.
It will transform the academy in a society becoming the director-general in new business. The new company will bring as name "Academy of Risorti S.r.L." (literally Academy of the Resurrected ltd.). Until his death, Monti cured with love and passion the redevelopment of film programming and theater shows. From 1975 to 1994, they were carried out the first restoration of the modern age, driven by engineers Vittorio Landi and Perugino Perugini. Among the work carried out there is the renewal of the wooden chairs, replaced by red velvet chairs, the restoration of the paintings and interior decorations, the renewal of the floor of the stalls and its main structures.

Recent developments 
To remain open, today the theater Dante plays an assiduous work as a movie theater, in order to propose periodically events and other kind of shows (like operettas, concertos and theatre season, and other live events). As a movie theater, uses the same policy, trying to offer various types of entertainment for all categories of users. The cinema was one of the first in the province in the 90s install the multi-channel digital audio, offering to the audience the sounds of Dolby Digital and DTS. The digitization process ends in 2011, when it was purchased the professional digital projector, that can offer to the audiences, 3D feature presentation movies and other stereoscopic contents.

Description 
Thanks to assiduous care, the theater space, even of medium size, has come to this day still intact with its neo-classical style, which makes it one of the most beautiful historic theaters in Tuscany. The theater is built according to the specifications of the nineteenth century Italian theaters, the main architectural features are the construction of the hall with a plant horseshoe, the elimination of the bleachers in favor of in favor of more box tiers, and the enlargement of the stage in favor of the new perspective wings. In the theater there are a total of 400 seats, divided in 190 seats in the stalls and in four tiers of boxes. There is also a small orchestra pit. Both the stalls that the stage has a little slope that is vanished in the area of pit.

The Academy 
The academy of resurrected, as we know it nowadays, was established in 1953, with the aim of making management activities of theaters, cinemas, and other opportunities for entertainment and education. The component of the academy are formed mostly by the old nobles family present in Sansepolcro. Over the years, academics have changed several times, acquiring or disposing their shareholdings in the company. A famous member of the academy was the family Buitoni.
The statute of the academy expressed clearly that the company was created with the same intent of its ancient founders, and that any proceeds obtained will be invested to support the running costs and adapt the structures to the times. No academic earns money from the theater and its activities.

The academics and the boxes 
The theater Dante underwent natural transformation of small theaters Italian born largely in the Renaissance, which have been transformed from theater to multi-purpose halls. During the renaissance, the nobles of Sansepolcro manage this theater for personal prestige and to be able to present artistic and cultural performances to the entire population. It followed, as usual, that every noble had his reserved seat, away from ordinary people, according to his shareholding in association. The most prominent members were sitting in the most central seats, the others, hand in hand in the more laterals. The nobles didn't sat in the stalls, but they were on the upper floors, in the boxes. Originally it seems were not present even the chairs in the stalls, and that some performances were paid exclusively by the nobility to exercise more prestige in town. Ordinary people, in the early years it seems that should bring home a chair, if they wanted to sit. To remember the tradition of the boxes, still it reserves the "academic box" the number 8 box on the first floor that however isn't the royal box (called also the central box, the number 9 in second tier of boxes).

Trivia 
 the theater was used by Italian director Mario Monicelli for the shooting of the movie Rossini! Rossini! After much research, it was the only theater in the center Italy who was willing to remove the bulbs and put candles and candlesticks during filming.

References

External links 
 

Neoclassical architecture in Tuscany
Theatres completed in 1836
Theatres in Tuscany
Cinemas in Italy
Buildings and structures in Sansepolcro
19th-century architecture in Italy